Ridleyandra is a genus of flowering plants belonging to the family Gesneriaceae.

Its native range is Thailand to western Malesia. It is found in Borneo, Malaya and Thailand.

The genus name of Ridleyandra is in honour of Henry Nicholas Ridley (1855–1956), an English botanist, geologist and naturalist who lived much of his life in Singapore. He was instrumental in promoting rubber trees in the Malay Peninsula. 
It was first described and published in Beitr. Biol. Pflanzen Vol.70 on page 171 (written in 1997–1998) publ. 1998.

Known species
According to Kew;

References

Didymocarpoideae
Gesneriaceae genera
Plants described in 1998
Flora of Borneo
Flora of Malaya
Flora of Thailand